Jérôme Vareille (born 1 June 1974 in Vernoux) is a former French footballer who spent much of his career in Scotland.

Career
Vareille began his career in his homeland with FC Metz before moving on to FC Mulhouse. Whilst playing for Mulhouse in a pre-season friendly against Kilmarnock F.C. Vareille scored two goals, convincing then Kille boss Bobby Williamson to sign him. Vareille spent over four seasons at the club and played 113 games (with 16 goals) in all competitions whilst at Rugby Park.

Vareille joined the doomed Airdrieonians late in the 2001–02 season, which was to be their last in existence. However, when Clydebank's league place was purchased by Jim Ballantyne for his new club Airdrie United, Vareille was contracted to this side. During his three seasons with the club he established a single season record goalscoring total, hitting 18 goals during the 2002–03 season and scored 4 goals in 14 minutes during a league game against Stenhousemuir in February 2004, setting a Scottish League record.

Vareille moved on to Ayr United in the close season of 2005 and remained at the club until the end of the 2007–08 season when he was released.

Personal life
His daughter, Olivia, is a promising athlete and featured on Reporting Scotland.

References

External links

Profile
Player profile - FC Metz

1974 births
Living people
French footballers
French expatriate footballers
FC Metz players
FC Mulhouse players
Kilmarnock F.C. players
Airdrieonians F.C. (1878) players
Airdrieonians F.C. players
Ayr United F.C. players
Bathgate Thistle F.C. players
Kilsyth Rangers F.C. players
Scottish Football League players
Scottish Premier League players
Expatriate footballers in Scotland
Association football forwards